The 1954–55 Segunda División season was the 24th since its establishment and was played between 11 September 1954 and 10 April 1955.

Overview before the season
32 teams joined the league, including 4 relegated from the 1953–54 La Liga and 7 promoted from the 1953–54 Tercera División.

Relegated from La Liga
Osasuna
Jaén
Oviedo
Real Gijón

Promoted from Tercera División

Juvenil
Sestao
Tarrasa
Extremadura
Levante
Real Betis
San Fernando

Group North

Teams

League table

Results

Top goalscorers

Top goalkeepers

Group South

Teams

League table

Results

Top goalscorers

Top goalkeepers

Promotion playoffs

League table

Results

External links
BDFútbol

Segunda División seasons
2
Spain